The 1914 VFL season was the 18th season of the Victorian Football League (VFL), the highest level senior Australian rules football competition in Victoria. The season featured ten clubs, ran from 25 April until 26 September, and comprised an 18-game home-and-away season followed by a finals series featuring the top four clubs.

The premiership was won by the Carlton Football Club for the fourth time, after it defeated  by six points in the 1914 VFL Grand Final.

Premiership season
In 1914, the VFL competition consisted of ten teams of 18 on-the-field players each, with no "reserves", although any of the 18 players who had left the playing field for any reason could later resume their place on the field at any time during the match.

Each team played each other twice in a home-and-away season of 18 rounds.

Once the 18 round home-and-away season had finished, the 1914 VFL Premiers were determined by the specific format and conventions of the amended "Argus system".

Round 1

|- bgcolor="#CCCCFF"
| Home team
| Home team score
| Away team
| Away team score
| Venue
| Date
|- bgcolor="#FFFFFF"
| 
| 13.15 (93)
| 
| 5.7 (37)
| Brunswick Street Oval
| 25 April 1914
|- bgcolor="#FFFFFF"
| 
| 6.8 (44)
| 
| 14.14 (98)
| MCG
| 25 April 1914
|- bgcolor="#FFFFFF"
| 
| 8.16 (64)
| 
| 5.12 (42)
| Junction Oval
| 25 April 1914
|- bgcolor="#FFFFFF"
| 
| 8.13 (61)
| 
| 8.13 (61)
| Corio Oval
| 25 April 1914
|- bgcolor="#FFFFFF"
| 
| 8.8 (56)
| 
| 6.20 (56)
| Victoria Park
| 25 April 1914

Round 2

|- bgcolor="#CCCCFF"
| Home team
| Home team score
| Away team
| Away team score
| Venue
| Date
|- bgcolor="#FFFFFF"
| 
| 12.14 (86)
| 
| 7.8 (50)
| EMCG
| 2 May 1914
|- bgcolor="#FFFFFF"
| 
| 4.11 (35)
| 
| 6.12 (48)
| Princes Park
| 2 May 1914
|- bgcolor="#FFFFFF"
| 
| 8.14 (62)
| 
| 7.9 (51)
| Lake Oval
| 2 May 1914
|- bgcolor="#FFFFFF"
| 
| 3.10 (28)
| 
| 9.15 (69)
| Punt Road Oval
| 2 May 1914
|- bgcolor="#FFFFFF"
| 
| 6.7 (43)
| 
| 9.13 (67)
| MCG
| 2 May 1914

Round 3

|- bgcolor="#CCCCFF"
| Home team
| Home team score
| Away team
| Away team score
| Venue
| Date
|- bgcolor="#FFFFFF"
| 
| 10.14 (74)
| 
| 9.4 (58)
| Corio Oval
| 9 May 1914
|- bgcolor="#FFFFFF"
| 
| 9.12 (66)
| 
| 11.8 (74)
| Brunswick Street Oval
| 9 May 1914
|- bgcolor="#FFFFFF"
| 
| 12.18 (90)
| 
| 4.12 (36)
| Victoria Park
| 9 May 1914
|- bgcolor="#FFFFFF"
| 
| 7.10 (52)
| 
| 9.15 (69)
| Junction Oval
| 9 May 1914
|- bgcolor="#FFFFFF"
| 
| 4.8 (32)
| 
| 13.24 (102)
| MCG
| 9 May 1914

Round 4

|- bgcolor="#CCCCFF"
| Home team
| Home team score
| Away team
| Away team score
| Venue
| Date
|- bgcolor="#FFFFFF"
| 
| 7.11 (53)
| 
| 7.7 (49)
| EMCG
| 16 May 1914
|- bgcolor="#FFFFFF"
| 
| 17.13 (115)
| 
| 8.7 (55)
| Junction Oval
| 16 May 1914
|- bgcolor="#FFFFFF"
| 
| 11.5 (71)
| 
| 13.9 (87)
| MCG
| 16 May 1914
|- bgcolor="#FFFFFF"
| 
| 7.12 (54)
| 
| 7.10 (52)
| Brunswick Street Oval
| 16 May 1914
|- bgcolor="#FFFFFF"
| 
| 8.4 (52)
| 
| 7.10 (52)
| Lake Oval
| 16 May 1914

Round 5

|- bgcolor="#CCCCFF"
| Home team
| Home team score
| Away team
| Away team score
| Venue
| Date
|- bgcolor="#FFFFFF"
| 
| 18.17 (125)
| 
| 7.11 (53)
| Victoria Park
| 23 May 1914
|- bgcolor="#FFFFFF"
| 
| 4.4 (28)
| 
| 6.10 (46)
| Princes Park
| 23 May 1914
|- bgcolor="#FFFFFF"
| 
| 11.11 (77)
| 
| 9.12 (66)
| Lake Oval
| 23 May 1914
|- bgcolor="#FFFFFF"
| 
| 10.17 (77)
| 
| 6.17 (53)
| Punt Road Oval
| 23 May 1914
|- bgcolor="#FFFFFF"
| 
| 5.7 (37)
| 
| 5.24 (54)
| MCG
| 23 May 1914

Round 6

|- bgcolor="#CCCCFF"
| Home team
| Home team score
| Away team
| Away team score
| Venue
| Date
|- bgcolor="#FFFFFF"
| 
| 5.11 (41)
| 
| 5.13 (43)
| EMCG
| 30 May 1914
|- bgcolor="#FFFFFF"
| 
| 13.19 (97)
| 
| 5.9 (39)
| Princes Park
| 30 May 1914
|- bgcolor="#FFFFFF"
| 
| 5.6 (36)
| 
| 16.14 (110)
| MCG
| 30 May 1914
|- bgcolor="#FFFFFF"
| 
| 4.8 (32)
| 
| 6.4 (40)
| Corio Oval
| 30 May 1914
|- bgcolor="#FFFFFF"
| 
| 12.10 (82)
| 
| 5.14 (44)
| Junction Oval
| 30 May 1914

Round 7

|- bgcolor="#CCCCFF"
| Home team
| Home team score
| Away team
| Away team score
| Venue
| Date
|- bgcolor="#FFFFFF"
| 
| 4.12 (36)
| 
| 7.12 (54)
| Punt Road Oval
| 6 June 1914
|- bgcolor="#FFFFFF"
| 
| 14.9 (93)
| 
| 5.16 (46)
| MCG
| 6 June 1914
|- bgcolor="#FFFFFF"
| 
| 10.13 (73)
| 
| 7.6 (48)
| Brunswick Street Oval
| 6 June 1914
|- bgcolor="#FFFFFF"
| 
| 11.12 (78)
| 
| 9.9 (63)
| Victoria Park
| 6 June 1914
|- bgcolor="#FFFFFF"
| 
| 9.11 (65)
| 
| 3.16 (34)
| Corio Oval
| 6 June 1914

Round 8

|- bgcolor="#CCCCFF"
| Home team
| Home team score
| Away team
| Away team score
| Venue
| Date
|- bgcolor="#FFFFFF"
| 
| 14.11 (95)
| 
| 6.17 (53)
| Punt Road Oval
| 8 June 1914
|- bgcolor="#FFFFFF"
| 
| 12.10 (82)
| 
| 8.10 (58)
| Junction Oval
| 8 June 1914
|- bgcolor="#FFFFFF"
| 
| 3.6 (24)
| 
| 15.18 (108)
| MCG
| 8 June 1914
|- bgcolor="#FFFFFF"
| 
| 5.13 (43)
| 
| 6.10 (46)
| Lake Oval
| 8 June 1914
|- bgcolor="#FFFFFF"
| 
| 6.3 (39)
| 
| 11.10 (76)
| EMCG
| 8 June 1914

Round 9

|- bgcolor="#CCCCFF"
| Home team
| Home team score
| Away team
| Away team score
| Venue
| Date
|- bgcolor="#FFFFFF"
| 
| 15.11 (101)
| 
| 10.7 (67)
| Junction Oval
| 13 June 1914
|- bgcolor="#FFFFFF"
| 
| 8.7 (55)
| 
| 13.12 (90)
| MCG
| 13 June 1914
|- bgcolor="#FFFFFF"
| 
| 5.13 (43)
| 
| 5.11 (41)
| Princes Park
| 13 June 1914
|- bgcolor="#FFFFFF"
| 
| 10.6 (66)
| 
| 7.8 (50)
| Brunswick Street Oval
| 13 June 1914
|- bgcolor="#FFFFFF"
| 
| 9.17 (71)
| 
| 5.6 (36)
| Corio Oval
| 13 June 1914

Round 10

|- bgcolor="#CCCCFF"
| Home team
| Home team score
| Away team
| Away team score
| Venue
| Date
|- bgcolor="#FFFFFF"
| 
| 9.16 (70)
| 
| 8.7 (55)
| Lake Oval
| 20 June 1914
|- bgcolor="#FFFFFF"
| 
| 9.14 (68)
| 
| 9.12 (66)
| Punt Road Oval
| 20 June 1914
|- bgcolor="#FFFFFF"
| 
| 9.13 (67)
| 
| 5.11 (41)
| EMCG
| 20 June 1914
|- bgcolor="#FFFFFF"
| 
| 6.16 (52)
| 
| 5.15 (45)
| Princes Park
| 20 June 1914
|- bgcolor="#FFFFFF"
| 
| 8.15 (63)
| 
| 12.11 (83)
| MCG
| 20 June 1914

Round 11

|- bgcolor="#CCCCFF"
| Home team
| Home team score
| Away team
| Away team score
| Venue
| Date
|- bgcolor="#FFFFFF"
| 
| 9.20 (74)
| 
| 6.9 (45)
| Corio Oval
| 27 June 1914
|- bgcolor="#FFFFFF"
| 
| 10.11 (71)
| 
| 4.15 (39)
| Brunswick Street Oval
| 27 June 1914
|- bgcolor="#FFFFFF"
| 
| 11.16 (82)
| 
| 7.10 (52)
| Victoria Park
| 27 June 1914
|- bgcolor="#FFFFFF"
| 
| 3.8 (26)
| 
| 14.21 (105)
| MCG
| 27 June 1914
|- bgcolor="#FFFFFF"
| 
| 7.8 (50)
| 
| 7.11 (53)
| Junction Oval
| 27 June 1914

Round 12

|- bgcolor="#CCCCFF"
| Home team
| Home team score
| Away team
| Away team score
| Venue
| Date
|- bgcolor="#FFFFFF"
| 
| 6.18 (54)
| 
| 8.6 (54)
| EMCG
| 4 July 1914
|- bgcolor="#FFFFFF"
| 
| 11.21 (87)
| 
| 8.8 (56)
| Princes Park
| 4 July 1914
|- bgcolor="#FFFFFF"
| 
| 3.4 (22)
| 
| 9.14 (68)
| MCG
| 4 July 1914
|- bgcolor="#FFFFFF"
| 
| 10.4 (64)
| 
| 7.12 (54)
| Lake Oval
| 4 July 1914
|- bgcolor="#FFFFFF"
| 
| 9.11 (65)
| 
| 6.13 (49)
| Punt Road Oval
| 4 July 1914

Round 13

|- bgcolor="#CCCCFF"
| Home team
| Home team score
| Away team
| Away team score
| Venue
| Date
|- bgcolor="#FFFFFF"
| 
| 7.6 (48)
| 
| 14.16 (100)
| MCG
| 11 July 1914
|- bgcolor="#FFFFFF"
| 
| 8.17 (65)
| 
| 3.3 (21)
| Corio Oval
| 11 July 1914
|- bgcolor="#FFFFFF"
| 
| 5.7 (37)
| 
| 3.16 (34)
| Victoria Park
| 11 July 1914
|- bgcolor="#FFFFFF"
| 
| 11.14 (80)
| 
| 9.6 (60)
| Princes Park
| 11 July 1914
|- bgcolor="#FFFFFF"
| 
| 8.21 (69)
| 
| 5.7 (37)
| Punt Road Oval
| 11 July 1914

Round 14

|- bgcolor="#CCCCFF"
| Home team
| Home team score
| Away team
| Away team score
| Venue
| Date
|- bgcolor="#FFFFFF"
| 
| 12.7 (79)
| 
| 7.15 (57)
| Junction Oval
| 18 July 1914
|- bgcolor="#FFFFFF"
| 
| 13.12 (90)
| 
| 3.12 (30)
| Corio Oval
| 18 July 1914
|- bgcolor="#FFFFFF"
| 
| 14.15 (99)
| 
| 6.5 (41)
| EMCG
| 18 July 1914
|- bgcolor="#FFFFFF"
| 
| 3.5 (23)
| 
| 15.13 (103)
| MCG
| 18 July 1914
|- bgcolor="#FFFFFF"
| 
| 4.13 (37)
| 
| 7.4 (46)
| Brunswick Street Oval
| 18 July 1914

Round 15

|- bgcolor="#CCCCFF"
| Home team
| Home team score
| Away team
| Away team score
| Venue
| Date
|- bgcolor="#FFFFFF"
| 
| 14.10 (94)
| 
| 10.11 (71)
| Punt Road Oval
| 25 July 1914
|- bgcolor="#FFFFFF"
| 
| 8.5 (53)
| 
| 11.13 (79)
| Brunswick Street Oval
| 25 July 1914
|- bgcolor="#FFFFFF"
| 
| 12.14 (86)
| 
| 7.5 (47)
| Victoria Park
| 25 July 1914
|- bgcolor="#FFFFFF"
| 
| 4.8 (32)
| 
| 15.14 (104)
| Lake Oval
| 25 July 1914
|- bgcolor="#FFFFFF"
| 
| 8.10 (58)
| 
| 16.15 (111)
| MCG
| 25 July 1914

Round 16

|- bgcolor="#CCCCFF"
| Home team
| Home team score
| Away team
| Away team score
| Venue
| Date
|- bgcolor="#FFFFFF"
| 
| 4.12 (36)
| 
| 5.4 (34)
| Princes Park
| 1 August 1914
|- bgcolor="#FFFFFF"
| 
| 8.9 (57)
| 
| 5.13 (43)
| Lake Oval
| 1 August 1914
|- bgcolor="#FFFFFF"
| 
| 6.12 (48)
| 
| 11.9 (75)
| MCG
| 1 August 1914
|- bgcolor="#FFFFFF"
| 
| 6.15 (51)
| 
| 7.11 (53)
| Junction Oval
| 1 August 1914
|- bgcolor="#FFFFFF"
| 
| 5.9 (39)
| 
| 6.12 (48)
| EMCG
| 1 August 1914

Round 17

|- bgcolor="#CCCCFF"
| Home team
| Home team score
| Away team
| Away team score
| Venue
| Date
|- bgcolor="#FFFFFF"
| 
| 8.10 (58)
| 
| 15.15 (105)
| MCG
| 22 August 1914
|- bgcolor="#FFFFFF"
| 
| 9.7 (61)
| 
| 5.15 (45)
| Corio Oval
| 22 August 1914
|- bgcolor="#FFFFFF"
| 
| 18.19 (127)
| 
| 6.2 (38)
| Brunswick Street Oval
| 22 August 1914
|- bgcolor="#FFFFFF"
| 
| 4.12 (36)
| 
| 8.9 (57)
| Victoria Park
| 22 August 1914
|- bgcolor="#FFFFFF"
| 
| 10.11 (71)
| 
| 7.8 (50)
| Princes Park
| 22 August 1914

Round 18

|- bgcolor="#CCCCFF"
| Home team
| Home team score
| Away team
| Away team score
| Venue
| Date
|- bgcolor="#FFFFFF"
| 
| 9.14 (68)
| 
| 7.8 (50)
| EMCG
| 29 August 1914
|- bgcolor="#FFFFFF"
| 
| 4.10 (34)
| 
| 8.10 (58)
| Victoria Park
| 29 August 1914
|- bgcolor="#FFFFFF"
| 
| 7.10 (52)
| 
| 13.15 (93)
| MCG
| 29 August 1914
|- bgcolor="#FFFFFF"
| 
| 10.18 (78)
| 
| 5.5 (35)
| Lake Oval
| 29 August 1914
|- bgcolor="#FFFFFF"
| 
| 8.9 (57)
| 
| 9.9 (63)
| Punt Road Oval
| 29 August 1914

Finals

All of the 1914 finals were played at the MCG so the home team in the semi-finals and Preliminary Final is purely the higher ranked team from the ladder but in the Grand Final the home team was the team that won the Preliminary Final.

Semi-finals

|- bgcolor="#CCCCFF"
| Home team
| Score
| Away team
| Score
| Venue
| Date
|- bgcolor="#FFFFFF"
| 
| 5.14 (44)
| 
| 5.7 (37)
| MCG
| 5 September
|- bgcolor="#FFFFFF"
| 
| 9.8 (62)
| 
| 5.12 (42)
| MCG
| 12 September

Preliminary final

|- bgcolor="#CCCCFF"
| Home team
| Score
| Away team
| Score
| Venue
| Date
|- bgcolor="#FFFFFF"
| 
| 5.13 (43)
| 
| 3.6 (24)
| MCG
| 19 September

Grand final

Carlton defeated South Melbourne 6.9 (45) to 4.15 (39), in front of a crowd of 30427 people. (For an explanation of scoring see Australian rules football.)

Ladder

Awards
 The 1914 VFL Premiership team was Carlton.
 The VFL's leading goalkicker was Dick Lee of Collingwood with 57 goals.
 University took the "wooden spoon" in 1914.

Notable events
 A crowd of 2,000 angry Carlton fans mobbed the field umpire after Carlton lost to St Kilda in round 2.
 In Round 14, Collingwood full-forward Dick Lee kicked eleven goals in the victory over University, equalling the record set by Jim McShane in 1899 for the most goals by a player in a game.
 In Round 16, a spectator ran onto the ground during the Essendon and South Melbourne match and hit Essendon captain Alan Belcher behind the ear. Belcher chased the spectator, struck him, and was reported for unseemly play. Belcher was cleared by the VFL tribunal.
University dropped out of the league and folded at the end of the season, having lost its last 51 matches. As of 2021, this remains the longest winless streak in VFL/AFL history.
 In his 27th and final game of VFL football in Round 18, Arthur Fitzroy Best kicked the entire Melbourne score of 5.5 (35).

See also
 List of VFL debuts in 1914
 1914 VFL Grand Final

Notes
:1. Geelong's score in the first semi-final is given in different sources as either 5.7 (37) or 5.8 (38).

References

 Hogan, P., The Tigers of Old, The Richmond Football Club, (Richmond), 1996. 
 Maplestone, M., Flying Higher: History of the Essendon Football Club 1872–1996, Essendon Football Club, (Melbourne), 1996. 
 Rogers, S. & Brown, A., Every Game Ever Played: VFL/AFL Results 1897–1997 (Sixth Edition), Viking Books, (Ringwood), 1998. 
 Ross, J. (ed), 100 Years of Australian Football 1897–1996: The Complete Story of the AFL, All the Big Stories, All the Great Pictures, All the Champions, Every AFL Season Reported, Viking, (Ringwood), 1996. 
 Ross, J. (ed.), The Australian Football Hall of Fame, HarperCollinsPublishers, (Pymble), 1999. 
 Atkinson, Graeme 3AW Book of Footy Records, Magistra Publishing Company Pty Ltd (South Melbourne), 1989.

External links
 1914 Season – AFL Tables

Australian Football League seasons
VFL season